Homospora is a monotypic moth genus in the family Geometridae described by Turner in 1904. Its only species, Homospora rhodoscopa, was first described by Oswald Bertram Lower in 1902. It is found in Australia.

References

Oenochrominae
Monotypic moth genera